Borys Mikhailovych Shchokin (May 2, 1945 – June 16, 2017) was a Ukrainian scientist, researcher and teacher who worked in the field of Electromechanical systems and Engineering.

Career 
Shchokin received his primary and secondary education in Ukraine. He received his Engineering Diploma from Odessa Polytechnic Institute in 1967. From 1976 until 2001, Shchokin taught Theoretical Mechanics, Mechanics of Machines, Resistance of Materials, Applied Mechanics, Machine Design, Robotics and Automation and Mechatronics in Mechanical Engineering Department of Odessa National Polytechnic University, Ukraine (1979-2001), Faculty of Mechanical Engineering and Information Science of University of Miskolc, Hungary (1981-1990), Faculty of Engineering of University of Cienfuegos, Cuba (1987). In 1990, he became a Professor of Mechanical Engineering Department in Odessa National Polytechnic University. In 1995 he became the member of IFToMM (International Federation for the Theory of Machines and Mechanisms) Technical Committee on Gearing. In 2001, Shchokin accepted a Research Associate position in Department of Mechanical and Industrial Engineering of Ryerson University in Toronto, Canada. Then from 2004 and until 2011, he was Adjunct Professor in Ryerson University, Faculty of Engineering, Architecture and Science on the basis of his work in parallel and distributed manipulators at Robotic and Manufacturing Automation Lab. In 2006, Shchokin was made a Honorary Professor of Miskolc University, Faculty of Engineering, Hungary.

Books And Papers 

 The theory of machines and mechanisms
 Optimal synthesis of manipulator schemes for industrial robots 
 Design and kinematic analysis of a rotary positioner

Borys Shchokin was also a member of the Scientific Committee for the book "Advances in Mechanisms Design".

Patents 
Shchokin owned more than 28 patents in the field of Mechanical Engineering.

 Closure panel counterbalance mechanism with friction device
 Electromechanical strut with motor-gearbox assembly having dual stage planetary gearbox
 Electromechanical strut with electromechanical brake and method of allowing and preventing movement of a closure member of a vehicle
 Magnetic Friction Clutch
 Electromechanical Strut

Death 
Shchokin died on June 16, 2017.

References 

1945 births
2017 deaths
Ukrainian emigrants to Canada
21st-century Ukrainian engineers
Electromechanical engineering